Subsonic 2: Bass Terror is an album by Bill Laswell and Nicholas Bullen, released on March 14, 1995 by Sub Rosa. It is the second release in Subsonic series, a succession of split albums produced by different artists focusing on guitar soundscapes.

Track listing

Personnel 
Adapted from the Subsonic 2: Bass Terror liner notes.
Musicians
Nicholas Bullen – prepared bass guitar, electronics and producer (2, 3)
Neil Griffiths – prepared bass guitar (3)
Bill Laswell – instruments and producer (1)
Technical personnel
Guy Marc Hinant – editing
Layng Martine – assistant engineer (1)
Manuel Mohino – mastering
Robert Musso – engineering (1)

Release history

References

External links 
 Subsonic 2: Bass Terror at Bandcamp
 

1995 albums
Split albums
Bill Laswell albums
Sub Rosa Records albums
Albums produced by Nicholas Bullen
Albums produced by Bill Laswell